African Rainbow Minerals Limited is a mining company based in South Africa. ARM has interests in a wide range of mines, including platinum and platinum group metals (PGMs), iron, coal, copper, and gold. ARM's Goedgevonden coalmine near Witbank is a flagship of their joint venture with Xstrata, and produces 6.7 million tons of coal per year. Production is expanding at the Two Rivers platinum mine in Mpumalanga. ARM owns 20% of Harmony Gold, the 12th largest gold mining company in the world with three mining operations in South Africa. Patrice Motsepe is the executive chairman; Mike Schmidt is CEO.

History

ARM was founded by Patrice Motsepe as South Africa's first black-owned mining company. Motsepe founded ARMGold in 1997, which went on to list on the Johannesburg Stock Exchange (JSE) in 2002. 

In 2003 ARMGold entered a merger with Harmony Gold Mining and Anglovaal, previously owned by Richard and Brian Menell, and became the largest group controlled by black entrepreneurs. The 2003 ARMGold merger with Harmony Gold Mining formed the world’s 5th largest gold producer. The ARMGold merger with Anglovaal Mining (Avmin) came after.

In 2009, ARM joined the International Council on Mining and Metals. In 2009, ARM was reported to be planning $1.12 billion investments in mining in Zimbabwe. In August 2010, ARM entered a $380 million joint venture with Vale to build a copper mine in Zambia, which was expected to produce 100,000 tons of copper.  In February 2016, ARM put a further $148 million bail out in place to preserve their broad-based black economic empowerment (B-BBEE) status. In March 2016, ARM reported that profits had been halved due to lower commodity prices. ARM also has had a 50% stake in Morobe Mining Joint Ventures (MMJV) of Papua New Guinea.  MMJV has operations in Hidden Valley and Wafi-Golpu  in Morobe Province approximately 50 kilometers south-west of Lae, Papua New Guinea.

See also 
List of companies traded on the JSE
List of companies of South Africa
List of mining companies
Economy of South Africa

References

External links 

African Rainbow Minerals website
News articles on African Rainbow Minerals

Mines in South Africa
Mining in South Africa
Companies based in Sandton
Companies listed on the Johannesburg Stock Exchange
Xstrata
Platinum mining companies